Samyuktha (born 11 September 1995 as Samyuktha Menon) is an Indian actress in Malayalam films.

Early life and education
Samyuktha was born on 11 September 1995, in Palakkad, Kerala, India. She did her schooling in Chinmaya Vidyalaya, Thathamangalam and she is a graduate in economics.

Career
Samyuktha made her film debut in 2016 with the Malayalam film Popcorn, where she played Anjana, the love interest of Shine Tom Chacko in the movie.

She appeared in the Tamil-language action thriller Kalari as Thenmozhi. She was cast to play the title role in Lilli, a 2018 Indian Malayalam-language revenge thriller flick, scripted and directed by the debutant Prasobh Vijayan. July Kaatril announced in around late 2017 is a romantic comedy Tamil film. The project was released in 2018. Her next release was Theevandi a Malayalam-language political satire film directed by debutante Fellini T. P. and written by Vini Vishwa Lal.

Samyuktha's first release for 2019 was Oru Yamandan Premakadha directed by B. C. Noufal and written by Bibin George and Vishnu Unnikrishnan. She made a cameo appearance in Uyare  as Tessa sharing screen space again with Tovino Thomas. Samyuktha played the role of Shivajith Padmanabhan's side-kick in 2019 action film Kalki which had Tovino Thomas in lead directed by Praveen Prabharam. She was later cast in Bheemla Nayak which was released in February 2022.

Filmography

References

External links

 
 

Living people
Actresses in Malayalam cinema
Indian film actresses
1995 births
Actresses in Tamil cinema
Actresses in Kannada cinema